Cytochrome c oxidase subunit VIb polypeptide 2 is a protein that in humans is encoded by the COX6B2 gene. Cytochrome c oxidase 6B2 is a subunit of the cytochrome c oxidase complex, also known as Complex IV, the last enzyme in the mitochondrial electron transport chain.

Structure
The COX6B2 gene, located on the q arm of chromosome 19 in position 13.42, contains 5 exons and is 5,113 base pairs in length. The protein encoded by the COX6B2 gene weighs 11 kDa and is composed of 88 amino acids. The protein is a subunit of Complex IV, a heteromeric complex consisting of 3 catalytic subunits encoded by mitochondrial genes and multiple structural subunits encoded by nuclear genes.

Function
Cytochrome c oxidase (COX) is the terminal enzyme of the mitochondrial respiratory chain. It is a multi-subunit enzyme complex that couples the transfer of electrons from cytochrome c to molecular oxygen and contributes to a proton electrochemical gradient across the inner mitochondrial membrane to drive ATP synthesis via protonmotive force.  The mitochondrially-encoded subunits perform the electron transfer of proton pumping activities. The functions of the nuclear-encoded subunits are unknown but they may play a role in the regulation and assembly of the complex.

Summary reaction:
 4 Fe2+-cytochrome c + 8 H+in + O2 → 4 Fe3+-cytochrome c + 2 H2O + 4 H+out

References

Further reading

External links 
 
Mass spectrometry characterization of COX6B2 at COPaKB